The 1936 United States presidential election in Maine was held on November 3, 1936 as part of the 1936 United States presidential election. The state voters chose five electors to the Electoral College, who voted for president and vice president.

Maine voted for Republican Party candidate Alf Landon of Kansas, over Democratic Party candidate and incumbent President Franklin D. Roosevelt. 

Landon won Maine by a margin of 13.97%, making it his best state in the Union, and with 55.49% of the popular vote, made it his second strongest state after nearby Vermont. This Landon achieved despite losing two counties (Washington and York) that had voted for Herbert Hoover in 1932, as he made gains of up to ten percent in the rock-ribbed Yankee counties of Hancock, Lincoln and Waldo.

Maine had been one of only 6 states to vote to re-elect Hoover, the embattled incumbent Republican president,  over FDR in the latter's 1932 landslide, and in 1936, it was one of only two states in the entire nation (along with nearby Vermont) to vote for Alf Landon over the wildly popular Roosevelt. Maine and Vermont ultimately would be the only states to reject FDR in all four of his presidential campaigns.

Results

Results by county

See also
 United States presidential elections in Maine
 1936 United States presidential election in Vermont - Alf Landon's other sole win in 1936

References

Maine
1936
1936 Maine elections